The Paraguayan Navy is the maritime force of the Armed Forces of Paraguay, in charge of the defense of Paraguay's waters despite not having direct access to the sea. 

It has gone to war on two occasions: the War of the Triple Alliance (1864–1870) against Brazil, Argentina, and Uruguay, and the Chaco War (1932-1935) against Bolivia.

Although Paraguay is a landlocked country, it has a strong naval tradition by virtue of the fact that it has access to the Atlantic Ocean through the Paraguay–Paraná rivers. The Paraguayan Navy has twelve bases. The main base is the Puerto Sajonia in Asuncion, followed by Bahia Negra, Ciudad del Este, Encarnacion, Salto del Guaira. It also has aviation facilities in Puerto Sajonia.

In terms of vessels, the Navy has 34 surface ships, some of which have reached centenarian age. (This is due in part to limited use and floating in fresh water.) The main vessels and the flagship of the Paraguay Navy is still Humaita, which was commissioned prior to Paraguay's involvement in the Chaco War. It has a further four patrol vessels, of which the oldest was commissioned in 1908 and the newest in 1985. The Navy has 17 patrol boats of various drafts, four of which were donated by Taiwan and the United States, while the other 13 were built locally. The rest of the fleet is composed of tugboats, barges, landing craft, transports, and a presidential yacht. The new additions are four Croc-class riverine vessels from Australia, plus 43 locally built riverline patrol vessels constructed from 2006–2009. For air support, one Helibras HB350 helicopter is used to provide SAR, MEDEVAC and utility work

Role

Its main mission is to contribute to the defense of Paraguay, in order to protect and guarantee sovereignty over its water resources.

These priorities include:
The custody and defense of the coasts, ports and areas of fluvial interest in its area of influence.
Logistics support base for future operations of the forces.
Exercise prefectural functions in its area of influence. 
Cooperate with the tasks of civil defense in cases of natural disasters, environmental protection and the restoration of internal order.

Fleet

Gunboats
  (built 1930)
 Humaitá (C-2) (still commissioned, but now designated as a museum ship; also built 1930)
River patrol ships
 Capitán Cabral (P-01)
 Itaipú (P-05)
Patrol vessels
 Capitán Ortiz (P-06)
 Teniente Robles (P-07)
 Yhaguy (P-08)
 Tebicuary (P-09)
 5 x patrol boats LP7-LP11
 2 x Class 701 patrol boats Class LP101 108
 2 x Croq-15 class patrol boats P201-202
 43 x Light patrol boats, all constructed in Paraguay between 2006 and 2009
 Pirá 500 SL 5 × 1.60 m. Yamaha 25 hp.
 Pirá 170 SVX 5.20 × 1.60 m. Yamaha 40 hp.
 Pirá 240 SVX 6.50 × 2,40 m. Yamaha 90 hp.
 Pirá 4.80 × 1.80 m. Yamaha 50 hp.
Tugboats:
 Triunfo R4 (1960), constructed in USA
 Angostura R5 (1960) constructed in USA
 Stella Maris R6 (1970)
 Esperanza R7 (1970)
Other
 Amphibious assault craft LCVP 3 (1980), constructed in Brazil
 1 x Floating dock: DF-1 (1944), constructed in USA
 1 x Training ship: Guaraní (1968), constructed in Spain
 1 x Presidential yacht: 3 de Febrero (1972)
 1 x Casualty ship - T1 (1964)

Naval Aviation

Ranks

Commissioned officer ranks
The rank insignia of commissioned officers.

Other ranks
The rank insignia of non-commissioned officers and enlisted personnel.

See also
 Air Force of Paraguay
 Paraguayan Army

References

External links 

 Official website

Military of Paraguay
Paraguay
Military units and formations established in 1811